Winterbourne may refer to:

Geography
Winterbourne (stream), a stream or river that is dry in summer

Places

Canada
Winterbourne, Ontario, unincorporated community

England
Winterbourne, Berkshire, village and civil parish
Winterbourne, Gloucestershire, South Gloucestershire, village and civil parish
Winterbourne Down, Gloucestershire, village
Winterbourne railway station
Winterbourne United F.C.
Winterbourne View, former private hospital for the disabled
Winterbourne, Kent, hamlet in Boughton under Blean parish
Winterbourne, Wiltshire, civil parish with three villages:
Winterbourne Dauntsey
Winterbourne Earls
Winterbourne Gunner
Winterbourne Abbas, Dorset, village and civil parish
Winterbourne Bassett, Wiltshire, village and civil parish
 Winterbourne Down, Wiltshire, hill overlooking Firsdown
Winterbourne Monkton, Wiltshire, village and civil parish
Winterbourne Steepleton, Dorset, village and civil parish
Winterbourne Stoke, Wiltshire, village and civil parish

United States
Winterbourne (Orange Park, Florida), also known as the John Ferguson House

Other uses
Winterbourne Academy, South Gloucestershire, England
Winterbourne Botanic Garden, Birmingham, England
Winterbourne Boys' Academy, London Borough of Croydon
Winterbourne United F.C., South Gloucestershire, England
Winterbourne (group), a musical group from Australia

See also
Winterborne (disambiguation)